WYNN-FM is a radio station broadcasting a Mainstream Urban format. Licensed to Florence, South Carolina. The station is licensed by the Federal Communications Commission (FCC) to broadcast at 106.3 with an effective radiated power (ERP) of 6 kW.

History
WSTN-FM played beautiful music in the early 1980s. The station was acquired by WJMX AM 970 and switched to CHR in January, 1985 as "106X". In 1988, format rival WPDZ 103.3 was acquired and the station transferred the format and call letters to the newly acquired frequency. In November 1988, the station was sold to WYNN AM 540, which migrated its Urban format to FM. The station is owned by Cumulus Media.

WYNN once aired Doug Banks in the morning and now broadcasts DeDe McGuire.

External links
WYNN-FM's Official Website

WYNN-FM's FCC entry

YNN-FM
Mainstream urban radio stations in the United States
Cumulus Media radio stations